Marlo Mendoza Peralta, D.D. (born July 13, 1950, in San Carlos, Pangasinan), is a prelate of the Roman Catholic Church in the Philippines. He is the current Archbishop of Nueva Segovia in the Philippines.

Career
Marlo Mendoza Peralta was ordained priest of Urdaneta, Pangasinan, Philippines on March 31, 1975. He was consecrated bishop on March 31, 2006. He then succeeded as Bishop of Alaminos on July 1, 2007, to 2014.

Archbishop of Nueva Segovia
On December 30, 2013, Pope Francis appointed Peralta to Archbishop of Nueva Segovia replacing retiring Archbishop Ernesto Salgado.

References

External links

1950 births
Living people
People from San Carlos, Pangasinan
21st-century Roman Catholic archbishops in the Philippines
Filipino bishops
Roman Catholic archbishops of Nueva Segovia